Richard Kiyoshi Tomita (July 8, 1927 – February 12, 2021) was an American weightlifter who competed in the 1948 Summer Olympics.

References

1927 births
2021 deaths
American male weightlifters
Olympic weightlifters of the United States
Weightlifters at the 1948 Summer Olympics
Place of birth missing
20th-century American people
21st-century American people